Sandila is a town and nagar palika parishad in Hardoi district in the Indian state of Uttar Pradesh. It serves as a tehsil headquarters within the district. Located midway between Hardoi and Lucknow, Sandila is a well-connected town with roads leading in all directions and a major broad gauge rail line passing through the south side of town. Important industries include sweets — its laddus are especially well-known — as well as beedi production and zardozi work.

Sandila is the oldest municipality in Hardoi district, established on 14 July 1868. As of 2011, its population is 58,346, in 9,663 households.

History
Nothing much is known about the ancient history of Sandila. According to folk sayings, it was a forested area, believed to be the worship land of legendary sage Shandilya. As per the British chronicles, the history of Sandila town started in the medieval period after Mohammad Ghori's capture of Delhi throne. Two brothers belonging to the martial Arkvanshi(Suryavanshi) Rajput  clan viz. Salhia singh and Malhia singh established the towns of Salhiapura (later known as Sandila) and Malhiapura (later known as Malihabad), respectively.
Sandila thus became the seat of Arkvanshi(Suryavanshi) power in the early 13th century and became a flourishing town under Arkvanshi Rajput. Arkvanshi held the region till last quarter of the 14th century, when a large army sent by Feroz Shah Tughlaq under his lieutenant Syed Makhdum Alauddin, captured the town and the adjoining areas after a fierce battle with Arkvanshies. The remains of Arkavanshi rule are seen in form of ruined fortresses in the mounds of Garhi Jindor, Malhaiyya garhi (Malaiyya), Sahinjana tila, Samad Khera, Muslewan garhi, Datli, Naurang garh (Tarauna), Sandi qila, and many others.
After the decline of Arkavanshi power, Sandila came under the rule of Delhi sultanate. The folklore of Arakhs (also called Arkawanshis or अर्कवंशी) still sings about the bravery of its heroes, Salhia and Malhia who were the son's of Suryawanshi kingh Maharaja Trilokchand Arkawanshi. In 1952 Biswas a flight lieutenant of Indian Air Force who was working in a Communication Flight unit in Lucknow took charge of the aircraft carrying army officials who were returning to New Delhi after an official visit. After it took off, suddenly a crew member observed an engine malfunction; subsequently a fire broke out. Biswas first tried extinguish it, but it was difficult to control. He decided to attempt a forced landing, and made a belly landing near Sandila town in Uttar Pradesh and successfully saved the lives of all the passengers. Biswas was awarded the Ashoka Chakra for his extraordinary example of bravery, intelligence and rationality.[1] Sandila is also known for its delicacy that's Laddos of Sandila raja kurga parshad all fimaly person king of sandila 1865 Bc adders (rani ka sievala) and all family other county rest a fimaly

The growth of Sandila was sped up by an influx of refugees, many of whom are said to have been fleeing persecution by Muhammad Shah Tughlaq. His successor Firoz Shah visited Sandila twice, once in 1353 on the way to Lucknow and again in 1374 on the way to Bahraich. The oldest mosque in Sandila, now in ruins, was built in 769 AH on his orders. The Tarikh-i-Mubarak Shahi records that Sandila was ruled by Malik Hisam-ul-Mulk in 1375, and in 1394 it came under the control of Khwaja-i-Jahan, the first ruler of the Jaunpur Sultanate.

By the time of Sher Shah Suri, Sandila had become so crowded that one Sayyid Husain founded a new town next to it, called Ashraf Tola. The Sayyids were supporters of Sher Shah, and when Humayun was returned to power, he expelled them and looted the city. The Sayyids' estates were given to the Chandelas instead, but the Sayyids gradually recovered them beginning during the reign of Aurangzeb and then especially under the Nawabs of Awadh.

Up to this point, Sandila had never been a centre of government. In fact, the lack of government officials here made Sandila a convenient refuge for people who wanted to avoid imperial writs. That changed during the reign of Akbar, who transferred the qazi of Mahona to Sandila, and then the other pargana officials came to follow. This is reflected in the Ain-i-Akbari, which lists Sandila as the seat of a pargana in Lucknow sarkar of Awadh subah. It supplied the imperial treasury with a revenue of 10,623,901 dams and contributed a force of 5,000 infantry and 100 cavalry to the imperial army. Sandila itself is recorded as having a brick fort at the time. In addition, another mosque was built in Akbar's time, in 962 AH. Another historic monument is the Bara Khambha, or "hall of twelve pillars", was built in 971 AH; it contains the tomb of Makhdum Sahib, the ancestor of Sandila's preeminent Muslim family.

A third old mosque was built in 1121 AH according to its Persian-language inscription. In 1850 the European traveller W. Sleeman visited Sandila; he described it as somewhat in decline but "well-situated and possessing an excellent climate."

At the turn of the 20th century, Sandila was the 7th-largest city in the Awadh region, with a population of 16,843 people. A slight majority (8,876) were Muslim, while Hindus formed the second-largest religious group (7,948). Sandila then comprised four mohallas: Ashraf Tola, Malkhana, Mandai, and Mahetwana. The town had a tehsil office, a police station, and a town hall, along with a post office, a cattle pound, and a dispensary. There was a middle school, a boys' lower primary school funded by the municipality, a private school in Ashraf Tola, and two girls' lower primary schools. A new sarai, called the Quinn Sarai, had recently been built by Kunwar Durga Parshad near the railway station. Sandila hosted markets on Tuesdays and Saturdays; the main items for sale were paan, ghee, and laddu. It was also known for door pardahs and coloured cotton tablecloths "of a pretty design in large checks." Firewood was also exported to Lucknow via train. The largest source of income for the municipal government was through the collection of octroi.

Apart from this, the Begum Qudsia Aizaz Rasul (2 April 1909 – 1 August 2001) was the only Muslim woman in the Constituent Assembly of India that drafted the Constitution of India. Qudsia was married in 1929 to Nawab Aizaz Rasul, the taluqdar'' (landowner) of Sandila in Hardoi district of what was then Oudh (now a part of Uttar Pradesh). The match was arranged by Sir Malcolm Hailey and the marriage was entirely harmonious. Two years after the wedding, when Qudsia was fourteen, her father died in 1931. Shortly after this happened, her in-laws came and took her away to Sandila, which was to be her home in life and where she lies buried after her death. In Sandila, Qudsia came to be addressed after her husband's name as "Begum Aizaz Rasool," and this is the name by which she is known in all public records.

Geography
It is around 50 kilometres away from district headquarters and also 50 kilometres away from Lucknow, the capital of Uttar Pradesh and is an important tehsil of the district Hardoi.

Demographics

The 2011 Census of India recorded the population of Sandila as 58,346 people, of whom 30,400 were male and 27,946 female. The corresponding sex ratio of 919 females to every 1000 males was the highest among towns in Hardoi district. Among the 0-6 age group, the sex ratio was 910, which was slightly above the district urban average of 906. Members of scheduled castes made up 8.13% of the town's population, and members of scheduled tribes made up 0.03%. The literacy rate of Sandila was 65.79% (counting only people age 7 and up); it was higher among men and boys (70.99%) than women and girls (60.15%). In terms of employment, Sandila had the highest percentage of main workers (i.e. people employed for at least 6 months per year) among towns in Hardoi district, with 27.15% falling into this category. Marginal workers made up 3.91%, and non-workers made up 68.94%. Employment status varied heavily according to gender, with 51.34% of men but only 9.01% of women being either main or marginal workers.

Economy 
As of 1971, the economy of Sandila was described as a mixture of the industrial, service, and commercial sectors (in that order). The main items imported were groundnuts, cloth, and grains; the main items manufactured were handloom cloth, brass utensils, and beedies; and the main exports were groundnuts, grain, and handloom cloth.

In 1981, Sandila was home to four medium- and large-scale factories, including two each in the public and private sectors. These included the Laxmi Sugar & Oil Mills Ltd., the oldest large-scale factory in the district, which was established in 1935 and as of 1981 was producing 24,000 tonnes of sugar. Raw sugarcane was supplied from Hardoi as well as parts of Sitapur district. There was also a textile mill, run by U.P. State Textiles Corporation Ltd., which at the time employed almost 1,000 weavers and was equipped with 25,000 spindles; an expansion was planned at the time that would double its size. A medium-scale factory run by U.P. Metal Industries Ltd. had been functioning since 1976 and was producing some 1,000 tonnes of metal pipe annually. The fourth, the Hardoi Co-operative Vanaspati Mills Ltd., was still under construction at the time.

Also described in 1981, the main powerlines connecting Lucknow's hydroelectric power supply to Hardoi run through Sandila; they include both a 132-kilovolt line and a 66-kilovolt one. The lion's share of electricity consumption in the district at the time was for irrigation and water supply, making up 57.34% of the total consumption.

As of 2022, Sandila Industrial Area have many big industries like Pepsi, British Paints, Berger Paints, Webley & Scott, ITC Limited, Haldiram's. Handgun biggie Webley & Scott's world famous revolver is already being manufactured in Sandila. Berger Paints Limited is setting up its factory on 35 acres of land at a cost of about Rs 850 crore and generating employment of 2500 people. British Paints Limited, a well-known company of England, has also started construction of its unit on over 10 acres of UP State Industrial Development Authority (UPSIDA) land at a cost of Rs 150 crore. Green Ply Company is setting up its unit on 35 acres of land at a cost of Rs 600 crore.  Austin Plywood Company is establishing its factory at a cost of Rs 50 crore and will employ 500 people. Gang Industries Ltd is setting up its distillery over 25 acres of land at a cost of Rs 250 crore. Varun Beverages Limited is setting up a factory at Sandila over 100 acres of land with an investment of Rs 700 crore to produce cold drinks, juices, etc. in association with Pepsi, generating 2000 people getting employment in this factory. Besides, ITC Limited is setting up its factory to produce flour, juice, chips, etc. over 60 acres land with an investment of Rs 800 crore. Haldiram is setting up its unit on five acres at a cost of about Rs 50 crore and will offer job opportunities to 250 people. Hindustan Food Limited is also setting up its factory at Sandila at a cost of Rs 100 crore.

Education
There are both government as well as private schools in the town affiliated with Central Board of Secondary Education, Indian Certificate of Secondary Education & Uttar Pradesh State Board of High School and Intermediate Education.

Government
Girls Government Inter College
Bhagwaan Budhh Inter College
Iltifat Rasool Inter College

Private
Saint Theresa School (ICSE)
Saira Bano Public School (CBSE)
Sandila Lions Public School (CBSE)

Sanitation
As of 1971, Sandila was one of two towns in Hardoi district (along with Hardoi itself) that had arrangements for mechanical transport and removal of night soil.

As of 2011, the drainage system employed in Sandila is open sewers, and 6,000 flush toilets have been installed in the town.

Transport

Roads
Town is well connected with district headquarters, state capital Lucknow and neighboring district headquarters like Sitapur, Unnao, Shahjahanpur, Lucknow, Kannauj. A national highway passes through the town connecting Lucknow with Shahjahanpur.

Rail
Sandila Railway Station is a railway station on broad gauge Lucknow-Moradabad line, that connects the town with Lucknow, Bareilly and country capital Delhi via Moradabad.

Bus 
Sandila does not have any bus station or depot, but UPSRTC buses are available in town square for neighboring districts & cities.

Electric Bus
Lucknow City Transport Services Limited (LCTSL) operates its services from Lucknow to Sandila or Vice Versa.

Air 
Nearest Airport is Chaudhary Charan Singh Airport, Lucknow, 60 kms away from the town.

Villages
At the turn of the 20th century, it was noted that many villages in Sandila pargana were unusually large because of past political instability. In (then-) recent years, "numberless hamlets have sprung up as offshoots of the larger villages," due to secure conditions.

As of 2011, Sandila CD block has the following 97 villages:

See also
Gausganj
Sandila Assembly constituency

References

Cities and towns in Hardoi district